Tatyana Borisovna Lyutaeva (born 12 March 1965) is a Soviet, Lithuanian, Russian theater actress, Honored Artist of the Russian Federation (2014). Member of the Union of Cinematographers of the Russian Federation.

Biography
In 1986 she graduated from the acting department of the Gerasimov Institute of Cinematography.

However, shortly after the shooting, Tatyana Lyutaeva left with her husband Olegas Ditkovskis in Vilnius, Lithuania, where from 1988 to 2004 she worked in the Russian Drama Theatre of Lithuania, organized festivals "Russian Cinema", continued to appear in films.

In 2004, together with her two children, she returned to Moscow and began to actively participate in film and television.

On 2 May 2014, by decree of the President of the Russian Federation Vladimir Putin, Tatyana Lyutaeva was awarded the honorary title of Honored Artist of the Russian Federation.

Filmography

References

External links
 

1965 births
Living people
Actors from Odesa
Soviet film actresses
Soviet stage actresses
Soviet television actresses
Lithuanian people of Russian descent
Lithuanian film actresses
Lithuanian stage actresses
Russian film actresses
Russian stage actresses
Russian television actresses
20th-century Russian actresses
21st-century Russian actresses
Honored Artists of the Russian Federation
Gerasimov Institute of Cinematography alumni